Catarman is the name of two municipalities in the Philippines:

Catarman, Camiguin
Catarman, Northern Samar